Ayyalaraju Ramabhadrudu :(Telugu: అయ్యలరాజు రామభద్రుడు), shortly Ramabhadra (16th century, CE) was a famous Telugu poet  and was one among the Astadiggajas, which was  the title of the group of eight poets in the court of King Krishnadevaraya, a ruler of the Vijayanagara Empire.

Biography
According to Kavali Venkata Ramaswamy, he was a native of the Ceded districts. His birthplace is widely considered as Cuddapah in Andhra Pradesh. He was patronised by Krishnadevaraya originally and later moved to the court of Gobburi Narasaraya, nephew of Aliya Rama Raya, after the death of Krishnadevaraya. He was also known as Pillala Ramabhadrudu.

Works
His famous work was Ramabhyudayamu and he dedicated the work to Narasaraya. At the request of Krishnadevaraya, he translated a work of the king into Telugu as Sakala Katha Sara Sangraham.

References

 Ayyalaraju Ramabhadhrudu
 K.A. Nilakanta Sastry, History of South India, From Prehistoric times to fall of Vijayanagar, 1955, OUP, New Delhi (Reprinted 2002) 
 Literary activity in Vijayanagara Empire

Telugu people
Telugu poets
People of the Vijayanagara Empire
Year of birth unknown
Year of death unknown
Indian male poets
16th-century Indian poets
Scholars of Vijayanagara Empire

te:అల్లసాని పెద్దన
Vijayanagara poets